Annika Boras (born February 28, 1981) is an American actress and director. As a theater actress, she received a Drama League Award nomination for her portrayal of Elektra in An Oresteia as well as a Lucille Lortel Award nomination for her performance in Edward Bond's Chair. In 2017, she worked alongside Octavia Spencer and Claire Danes for the film A Kid Like Jake, directed by Silas Howard. She also appeared as Mrs. Alsop in The Post, starring Meryl Streep and Tom Hanks directed by Steven Spielberg.

Early life and education
Boras was born in New Jersey, to Erika (Nelson) Boras (now Erika Tesi), a classical cellist and music educator, and Dr. Tom Boras, a jazz saxophonist, composer and the director of jazz studies at NYU. She was raised in Bergen County, New Jersey and Greenwich Village. Boras has one sister, Brit Boras. She began studies to receive a Bachelor of Music at New York University. After a year, she left NYU to study acting in London. Boras graduated from the Royal Academy of Dramatic Art.

Filmography

Film

Television

Theater

Awards and nominations

Personal life 
Boras is the maternal granddaughter of The Public Theater actor Herbert Nelson and actress/director Joan Deweese. As of September 2020, she is engaged to playwright Ayad Akhtar.

References

External links
 Annika Boras at the Internet Off-Broadway Database 
 

American actresses
Living people
Alumni of RADA
1981 births
21st-century American women